Fritz Felix Pipes (also "Piepes"; 15 April 1887 – 20 January 1983) was an Austrian tennis player who was born in Prague. He was Jewish, and was a medical doctor. At the 1912 Stockholm Olympics he teamed up with Arthur Zborzil to win a silver medal for Austria in the men's doubles event. 

He also competed for Austria in singles in 1912, and in both singles and doubles (with Zborzil) at the 1908 Summer Olympics.

He was runner-up in the Austrian International Championship in both 1909 and 1913. He twice played at the World Hard Court Championships, losing in round one of singles in 1912 and in the quarterfinals of mixed doubles in 1912, and in round two in 1913.

See also
List of select Jewish tennis players

References

External links
 
 

1887 births
1983 deaths
Austrian male tennis players
Austrian Jews
Jewish tennis players
Olympic tennis players of Austria
Olympic silver medalists for Austria
Tennis players at the 1908 Summer Olympics
Tennis players at the 1912 Summer Olympics
Olympic medalists in tennis
Medalists at the 1912 Summer Olympics